Voldemar Mägi (4 November 1914 – 18 February 1954) was an Estonian wrestler. He competed in the men's Greco-Roman middleweight at the 1936 Summer Olympics.

References

1914 births
1954 deaths
Estonian male sport wrestlers
Olympic wrestlers of Estonia
Wrestlers at the 1936 Summer Olympics
People from Tapa Parish
20th-century Estonian people